Terry Johnson (born November 28, 1958) is a Canadian former professional ice hockey defenceman who played 285 games in the National Hockey League with the Quebec Nordiques, St. Louis Blues, Calgary Flames, and Toronto Maple Leafs between 1980 and 1988.

Johnson was born in Calgary, Alberta.

Career statistics

Regular season and playoffs

External links 
 

1958 births
Living people
Calgary Canucks players
Calgary Flames players
Canadian ice hockey defencemen
Fredericton Express players
Hershey Bears players
Newmarket Saints players
Quebec Nordiques players
St. Louis Blues players
Saskatoon Blades players
Ice hockey people from Calgary
Syracuse Firebirds players
Toronto Maple Leafs players
Undrafted National Hockey League players